Intermuscular septum of thigh may refer to:

 Lateral intermuscular septum of thigh
 Medial intermuscular septum of thigh